Timur Shah Durrani, also known as Timur Shah Abdali or Taimur Shah Abdali (December 1746 – May 20, 1793) was the second ruler of the Afghan Durrani Empire, from November 1772 until his death in 1793. An ethnic Pashtun, he was the second eldest son of Ahmad Shah Durrani. Timur Shah would prominently be the governor of many cities in Punjab for the Durrani Empire, however usually forced out after Sikh armies would defeat him in battle. Timur Shah's reign would began after the death of his father, Ahmad Shah Durrani. This event would place the Durrani Empire into disarray, as multiple combatants would begin fighting for power, Timur Shah led a successful campaign against a coalition his brother, Humayun Mirza had made, securing power for himself. His prominent reign would see the Durrani Empire being held through tough times, Timur Shah also notably changed the capital of the Durrani Empire from Kandahar to Kabul, which is what would affect the state of modern Afghanistan today, with Kabul as its Capital city. Timur Shah also used Peshawar as his winter capital.

Timur Shah would wage multiple campaigns against his enemies who were trying to carve the believed to be declining Durrani Empire, with Timur Shah managing multiple campaigns in the Punjab region. He would also enter conflict with the Shah of Bukhara, and would fight multiple rebellions against him. After his death, his son, Zaman Shah Durrani would succeed the throne, beginning a succession crisis between Timur Shah's multiple sons, notably among Shah Shuja Durrani and Mahmud Shah Durrani.

Early life (1746-1772)
Timur Shah was born in December 1746, in Mashhad. While his father, Ahmad Shah Durrani, was accompanying Nader Shah, the ruler of the Afsharid Empire. Following the assassination of Nader Shah in 1747, Timur Shah moved to Kandahar with his father, Ahmad Shah Durrani, who would begin consolidating power for himself, forming the Afghan Durrani Empire. Timur Shah saw a quick rise to power by marrying the daughter of the Mughal Emperor Alamgir II in 1757. 

He received the city of Sirhind as a wedding gift under his governorship, and was later given the title of Viceroy of Punjab, Kashmir and the Sirhind district in 1757 (when he was only 11 years old), by his father Ahmad Shah Durrani for one year, from May 1757 until April 1758. Ahmad Shah Durrani had immediately appointed Toryal Khan Afridi, the eldest son of his army's commander and his most trustworthy soldier, Awalmir Khan Afridi, to teach horseback riding and swordsmanship to Timur Shah Durrani. Toryal Khan Afridi also had the responsibility for the safety and protection of Timur Shah Durrani, so he continuously stayed with Timur Shah Durrani in the royal palace. 

This would prepare Timur Shah for his planned succession of the Durrani Empire.

During Timur Shah's early years, he would spend his time ruling over Herat and governing parts of the Punjab for his father, Ahmad Shah Durrani. He would gain early experience in combat by fighting in battles against the Sikhs and the Maratha Empire. This would include the battles of Amritsar, Lahore, Peshawar, and more. However, his early career as a general was not successful, as he faced many defeats, mainly due his father placing him at a military position at an early age, with his first battle being when he was 11, his inexperience and the overwhelming number of enemies he faced during the aforementioned battles. As a result, he was defeated and often forced to retreat back to Afghanistan, to the protection of his father. He would spend the majority of his early life ruling over Herat, as his rule in the Punjab was limited.

Death of Ahmad Shah and Battle with Humayun (1772) 

In 1772, a few months before his death, Ahmad Shah summoned Timur Shah from Herat and publicly declared him heir to the Durrani Empire. Ahmad Shah made this decision without consulting with his tribal council. As a result, the authority of the Durrani Emperor was put into question and created a growing rift that would toil the Durrani empire for years to come, as the tribal council had in majority, supported Ahmad Shah's eldest son and Timur Shah's brother, Sulaiman, the governor of Kandahar. Shah Wali Khan, Ahmad Shah's Wazir, and Sardar Jahan Khan were prominent court figures who supported the Sulaiman faction. The court had attempted to urge Ahmad Shah to reconsider his decision, coinciding with the fact that the eldest son should ascend to the throne. Ahmad had ignored this, and quoted: "Timur Shah was infinitely more capable of governing you than his brother". As well as accusing Sulaiman of being "violent without clemency" and out of favour with the Kandahari Durranis. Ahmad Shah's decision could have been influenced by his illness, which had affected his brain and his mental state. However, choosing of succession to Timur Shah was likely to restrict power to the Senior Generals and the Durrani Tribal Council, which he deemed a threat to his dynasty in the future.

When Ahmad Shah was on his death bed, Sardar Jahan Khan had capitalized on Timur Shah's far proximity with him ruling over Herat, and poisoned the ear of the Shah. This had worked as Timur Shah was denied an by Ahmad Shah on his deathbed, as a result, Timur Shah had begun mobilizing his forces for the inevitable conflict with his brother. Timur Shah's plans were stalled however, as a rebellion by Darwish Ali Khan under the Sunni Hazaras, likely instigated by the Sulaiman faction had risen up. Timur Shah had crushed this revolt quickly and Darwish Khan was imprisoned, however he had escaped. Timur Shah had then lured him into Herat, offering pardon, where then Timur Shah had ordered his execution where his nephew, Muhammad Khan would be appointed in his place.

During the revolt of Darwish, Ahmad Shah had died of his illness in 1772. Shah Wali Khan and Sardar Jahan Khan kept the Shah's death a secret by placing the body on a palanquin covered by thick curtains. They had then left the King's mountain, taking as much treasure as they could and marched to Kandahar. Shah Wali Khan had also announced to everyone that the king was ill and had given orders to not disturb him except his trusted officials. To make the deception more believable, Ahmad Shah's chief eunuch, Yaqut Khan, had brought food for the "Sick" ruler. Shah wali Khan had then notified Sulaiman that Ahmad Shah was dead and proclaimed Sulaiman as king. However, many of the Amirs, including Mahadad Khan, had disliked Shah Wali's ambitions, and thus had fled to Timur's side, also notifying him of the ongoing situation at Kandahar.
Timur Shah  then marched toward Kandahar to face Shah Humayun. Shah Wali, fearing of Timur's march had consulted with Shah Humayun, and had agreed on him marching out to Prince Timur Shah to welcome him. He left Kandahar with over 150 horsemen and had arrived at Prince Timur's force at Farah. Having not sent word, once Shah Wali had dismounted, Timur Shah ordered the killing of Shah Wali. Angu Khan Bamiza'i assassinated Shah Wali Khan and his two sons, including 2 of his sisters children. Shah Sulayman surrendered the throne to Timur Shah following this, and became a loyal follower of him according to the depiction of Amir Habibullah Khan.

Reign (1772-1793)

Consolidation of power and rebellion of Al-Khaliq (1772-1774)
Timur Shah had ascended to the throne of the Durrani Empire in November 1772 with Shah Humayun giving up his throne.
The stone of Timur Shah's signet ring was inscribed with the verse:
 
Timur Shah's coins were inscribed with: 

Having ascended to the throne, Timur Shah would then effort to consolidate the throne and power. Following his ceremony of coronation, many of the Amir's who supported him were rewarded greatly, and many of the former positions held by Ahmad Shah's advisors remained the same under the same people. Gifts included were Robes (Khil'ats), this had put many in of him. After holding in Kandahar to resolve the ongoing issues of the city, Timur Shah marched to Kabul to consolidate power further in the region. Upon his arrival, he conducted a purge of the Durrani Amirs who had shown negative opinions towards Shah Wali's killing, where the Amirs had declared opposition to Timur Shah. Well aware of their opposition, Timur Shah had called the Amirs to a tribunal and had them executed alongside the diwan-begi. 

The remaining Durrani Amirs, fearing of Timur's wrath against them had begun plotting a coup, with them presented under 'Abd Al-Khaliq Khan Sadozai, centred in Kandahar, who had also thought of himself as an uncle to Ahmad Shah. Thinking the larger number of the Durranis was sufficient strength for him and his plot, he laid claim to the Durrani Empire. In little time, no more than 60,000 men had flocked toward his cause, Al-Khaliq had then left Kandahar to march on Kabul, where Timur Shah had resided to bring down his regime. Timur Shah, with no more than 6,000 men bravely marched out to combat with Al-Khaliq. Seeing Timur Shah's bravery, and Habibullah's claim of divine favor of Timur Shah, Payendah Khan Barakzai, Mihrab Khan Sherzai, and Dilawar Khan Ishaqzai all defected from Al-Khaliq's cause, and hurried to join the Shah including their own bodies of men, and following these defections from prominent Sardars, many of Al-Khaliq's men deserted as well. 

The two sides eventually met in a fierce battle, with Al-Khaliq's rebellion was shortly crushed and Al-Khaliq was blinded. The rest of the Amirs were ransomed in Timur Shah's name, and were sent home. A number of officers were also taken prisoner. After this victory, Payandeh Khan, Dilawar Khan, both who had abandoned Al-Khaliq's cause were rewarded and given titles, with the title of "Sarfaraz Khan" to Payandeh Khan, and Madad Khan to Dilawar Khan. Timur Shah then marched to Kandahar to investigate any further conspirators who may have been included in the plot. Timur Shah had isolated the Pashtun tribes, and put in charge Qizilbash guards and Hazaras were assigned to the Ghulam Corps of the Durrani Empire, these were the groups that Timur Shah relied on for his hold on power, and trusted thoroughly. The Durrani Pashtuns had soon fallen out of favor after this.

Insurrection of Fayz Allah Khan and Attempted Assassination of Timur Shah (1774-1776)

Timur Shah went to Peshawar to spend the winter there. Fayz Allah, interested seizing the Durrani throne from Timur Shah, began building up support and looking for followers. He was joind by Yaqut Khan, a eunuch and other Sardars, they had plotted a plan to assassinate Timur Shah while he was spending his winter in Peshawar. In league with the leading zamindars of Peshawar, Asad Allah Khan had sent a message to the Shah that said, "The Sikhs have joined forces and are harassing the Muslims of Punjab. If the permission is granted we, together with a group of Khalil, Mohmand, and other tribesmen, will disperse them, purge the Punjab of their presence, and put it back into the hands of Afghan officials." Unaware of their intent to assassinate him, Timur Shah accepted. Fayz Allah then mobilized 20,000 men, according to Tarikh-i-Sultani, 25,000. Nonetheless, Fayz Allah awaited for the opportune moment. 

One day, after lunch, Timur Shah went to the Bala Hissar, Peshawar and took a nap. Fayz Allah and his followers saw this as the opportune moment and entered the citadel, regarding to the guards that the Shah was going to inspect there troops. Although the guards kept notifying them that the Shah was asleep, they insisted claiming the Shah had wanted to see them. In response, Fayz Allah and his conspirators drew their swords and killed the guards, and wounded other Afghans in the process, including the head chef who were eating in the royal kitchen. Following this, Mongol, Jamshidi, and Qalmaq guards who were on duty near the royal harem noticed the horde of Afghans including Fayz Allah and woke Timur Shah. 

Timur Shah, fearing for his life had climbed to the top of a building which stood at the ramparts between the south side of the Bala Hissar. He had a ladder pulled up and ordered the corp of Ghulams, a Qizilbash contingent, and others guarding around the area to assault and kill the rebels. The guards attacked the rebels, including people who even looked like the followers of Fayz Allah Khan. They drew the fighting about Eight Kuruhs from the city, and massacred so many that one could not move in the citadel parade ground or Royal Harem without stepping on a body. 

The rebels were finally defeated and around 6,000 dead were counted. Fayz Allah Khan and his son were taken prisoner, and executed for these attempted crimes. Yaqut Khan, a eunuch who was following Fayz Allah Khan's cause was also executed for leaving a trail of rice to where Timur Shah was resting. Tarikh-I-Sultan states that most of the rebels were slain by a man named Aslan Khan Jawanshayr, imprisoned for wasting government funds. Amid the chaos, Aslan Khan had thrown himself into battle, fighting with the rebels for the sake of the Shah. Timur Shah even noticed him, and when the battle was over, he came down from the citadel and had pardoned and awarded Aslan Khan with a robe of honor. 

Timur Shah returned from Peshawar to Kabul in 1776, and started more reforms by making Kabul the new capital of the Durrani Empire, mostly due to the fact that he placed his administrative affairs into the hands of the Qizilbash, who he favored toward and were also centred in Kabul. Kabul was also the centre of the Durrani Empire, allowing for Timur Shah to march out wherever he needed to from the point, making it easier to deal with problems from wherever they arose from. Timur Shah also had trust issues with the Durranis of Kandahar and was disliked. Kandahar also did not have any protection against modern artillery of the time, on the other hand, Kabul was surrounded by high mountains and had a strong citadel. The Bala Hissar in Kabul was also plated with a double-line of thick-stone faced walls. This also helped with the mounting of riflemen and artillery on different points in the citadel. 

The city of Kabul at the time was also depicted as a sprawling urban city, with mild climate and natural beauty. As a result of these summed up reasons, Timur Shah made Kabul the capital. This reform also proved to be successful for Timur Shah, as the senior Durrani officials had to choose between staying in Kandahar or moving to Kabul. This undermined the influence of the Durrani officials, due to the reason being that if they stayed in Kandahar, they would be isolated politically from Durrani politics. And if they were to move to Kabul, they would be cut off from their tribal base, as Kabul was inhabited by a mixture of different tribes, and ethnicities.

Timur Shah's campaign against the Sikhs (1776-1780)

Battle of Rohtas (December,1779) 

A year before the death of Ahmad Shah Durrani, the Sikhs conquered Multan in 1772.Timur Shah ascended to the throne of the Durrani Empire after his father’s death.Due to Sikhs having been in possession of the provinces of Lahore and Multan, these provinces served as a barrier for any attempt by Timur Shah to invade, many chiefs and nobility, dependencies of Durranis, paid no respect to the Durrani sovereignty, such as Sindh which reduced the amount of tribute and hardly paid it, mostly due to its concurrent civil war between the Talpurs, and the Kalhoras; Nasir Khan Baloch, the ruler of the Khanate of Kalat under Timur Shah did not acknowledge the authority of Afghan monarch, as a result, inducing other Durrani chiefdoms to do the same, including the chief of Bahawalpur, who treated the authority of Timur Shah with no respect. Timur Shah thereupon tried to recover Multan by diplomacy and therefore sent Haji Ali Khan, as his agent, along with companions, to the Bhangi Sikh Chiefs to negotiate, with advise to behave and be polite, but instead, Haji Ali Khan threatened the Bhangi Chiefs to retire from Multan or face the royal wrath. The Bhangis tied Haji to the tree and shot him dead whereas his companions were left unharmed and sent back to report to Timur. 

Upon the news of death of his agent, Timur Shah detached a force of 18,000 men that included Yusafzais, Durranis, Mughals and Qizalbashes under general Zangi Khan, with orders to march by less known routes and fall upon the Sikhs unaware and Zangi Khan gave strict orders to his army to keep the movement secret. Zangi Khan halted 25kms from the Sikh camps with orders to imprison anyone who goes in the direction of the Sikh camp to make the Sikhs aware of their presence. Timur Shah positioned himself in the centre, at the head of 5,000 Yusafzai men. Little before daybreak, early morning, the Sikhs completely unaware of Afghan army’s presence, were attacked, and though unorganized, the Sikhs gave tough resistance but were eventually overwhelmed. About 3000 Sikhs were killed, and 500 others drowned in river Jhelum in trying to cross it during the Sikh retreat, while 2000 escaped by successfully reaching the opposite bank of the river.

Siege of Multan (January-February,1780) 

A mere four days after the Shah's departure from Peshawar, he had returned with many celebrations put into place, Zangi-Khan was also given a robe of honor. Timur Shah  also marched on Multan, besieging the city in January 1780. The Afghans were also reinforced from the successor of Nawab Shuja Khan and the Nawab of Bahawalpur, with an extra 12,000 men being sent to support the siege. The Bhangi Sikhs, under their leader, Jassa Singh, arrived with 15,000 horsemen reached Multan from Lahore. Seeing Multan under siege, the Sikhs moved to Shujabad. Muzaffar Khan sent his contingent to intercept the Sikhs there. While they were preparing, a duststorm had swept a confused Sikh drummer onto the side of the Afghans, the Afghans captured him and spared his life on the condition that he would play the drum for the Sikhs to come. The Sikh drummer started beating his drum, with the Sikh armies preparing, the Afghans had split their armies into two lines due to poor visibility from the sandstorm, in such a way that once the Sikh armies would approach them, small pockets of men would be caught off guard, this process continued with the Sikhs losing thousands of men. When the dust storm finally ended, the Sikhs realized what had occurred and retreated to Lahore. 

Muzaffar Khan returned to Timur Shah to support his siege once again, also getting his support by bringing him the heads of those Sikhs who were killed in the battle. Abdul Karim Khan Babar, a Muslim general in the Sikh army, was convinced by Timur Shah to try and negotiate with the Sikhs. Abdul Karim opened negotiations with Sikh Sardars. The Sikhs, knowing they did not have the proper resources to resist the Afghan incursion, sued for peace. With the Sikhs giving the Shah's official the keys to the citadel, and were in return given security for their lives and possessions. Timur Shah took Multan in February 1780. After consolidating Multan, Timur Shah gave the city over to Shuja Khan Sadozai, not to be confused with Shah Shuja Durrani and returned to Peshawar. Timur Shah later left Peshawar to return to Kabul, also holding celebration there of his victories.

Timur Shah's second march to Multan and conquest of Bahawalpur (1780-1782)
After Timur Shah had returned to Kabul, his governors, Rukn al-Din Muhammad Bahawal Khan Bahadur 'Abassi and Nusrat Jang Hafiz al-Mulk without going in the way of each other and seized many districts in the regions of Multan and Sindh, they then suspended tribute to the Shah's officials and declared full independence from the Durrani Empire. Timur Shah, having heard of this was angered, and forged a formidable force, and returned to Multan. Learning of the arrival of Timur Shah, Bahawul Khan left the town of Bahawalpur, around 35 kuruhs south-east of Multan. Taking refuge in a barren plain with a fort he had in case of emergency use. Timur Shah then dispatched forces to sack and loot the town of Bahawalpur, these scouting forces burned houses and several buildings. Timur Shah had also entered the town himself, ordering the destruction of Bahawal Khan's property. 

Timur Shah then dispatched Mahadad Khan Ishaqzai with 20,000 men and proper provisions to siege the fort Bahawal Khan had taken refuge in. Timur Shah gave provisions to Mahadad Khan to siege the city for 3 days before rotating with a relief force. But during this period of time, Mahadad Khan managed to dig a well and solved his water problems. His force of 20,000 continued to siege the city, with prolific artillery bombardment of the forts walls. The heavy barrage started a fire in the arsenal of the fort, and powder that was stored in the arsenal had exploded, making various openings in the walls for Mahadad Khan to breach. With the walls open, Mahadad Khan ordered his forces to charge the now breached fort, the capture ended in Mahadad Khan's victory, securing the fort. Much of Bahawal Khan's property was destroyed in this siege, and the fate of Bahawal Khan was that he was pardoned. It was also formally concluded that Bahawal Khan would continue to pay taxes, Bahawal Khan was bestowed upon the robe of honor by Timur Shah, and also given governorship of Multan, Bahawal Khan would also be obligated to help Timur Shah in Punjab against the Sikhs if such situation ever arose. Having secured Multan and Bahawulpur, including his stability over Punjab relatively secure, Timur Shah returned to Kabul.

Kashmir Rebellion of Azad Khan (1783-1786)
During the reign of Ahmad Shah Durrani, Hajji Karimdad-Khan was named governor of Kashmir, after his death, his son, Azad Khan was confirmed as successor and ruled Kashmir, beginning his rule from Srinagar in 1783, at the age of 18 years old. During the beginning of his reign, Azad Khan began to centralize rule to himself rather than the rulers of the Durrani Empire, attempting to become independent in rather than staying loyal to Timur Shah, as he expelled his brothers who were loyal to the Shah. Followed by this, he also diverted tribute from the Shah toward himself and did not pay tax revenue. In 1783 of the same year, Azad Khan invaded the neighboring princely state of Kishtwar, Azad conquered the state, but instead of collecting tribute from it again, he annexed the state into his kingdom. After he had returned from the Kishtwar campaign, Azad Khan besieged Poonch. The ruler of Poonch, Rustam Khan, accepted his suzerainty and offered tribute for peace. Azad Khan led another campaign against Poonch in 1784, taking tribute from Poonch. Following these victories, Azad Khan completely cut off his allegiance to Timur Shah. He declared his allegiance to the Ottoman Empire and called himself the "Second Nadir Shah".  

Seeing the unfavorable position he was in, Azad Khan re-declared himself under the suzerainty of Timur Shah. However, the news of Azad Khan's return to Durrani Suzerainty had not reached Kabul, as a result, Timur Shah, hearing of the news, and trouble caused by Azad Khan dispatched Mir Muhammad 'Ali Khan also known as Kifayat Khan Musawi to try and evade conflict. After some counseling toward Azad Khan and what would become the consequences of his actions, Muhammad 'Ali Khan seized 3 laks of rupees in cash to make up for Azad Khan's disobedience.  As Mir Muhammad was preparing to return to Kabul, it was believed that he sent letter to Timur Shah about Azad Khan's clear disobedience,  even spreading rumor that he even possibly planned to attack Kabul after consolidating rule in Kashmir. Timur Shah dispatched around 30,000 under the command of Azad Khan's two brothers, Murtaza Khan and Zaman Khan, who were angered about Azad Khan expelling them from Kashmir. Muhammad 'Ali Khan was still in Kashmir when Timur Shah's army arrived, and made camp at the town of Bakali. Azad Khan was also in the same town where Timur Shah's men begun to set up camp, Azad Khan arrived to the bank of the river where Timur Shah's armies and him were separated. The Shah's troops called out from their camp, asking 
"Who are you, and what are you here for?
Azad Khan responded with
"I am your lord and master"
After saying this, Azad Khan fired three times in the air and withdrew back into the city. In the following day, a skirmish began against the Shah's troops and Azad Khan's followers, in this battle, Azam Khan and Azad Khan's military commander were killed. Azad Khan's followers were defeated and around 2,000 of his men drowned in the Muzaffarabad river. Azad Khan attempted to escape by boat from the battle, however his cousin, Pahlawan Khan, who said to him as quoted
"At the time you decided to rebel, you put on the demeanor of insincerity and wouldn't listen to my advice. Now you must stand and make a determined fight so that perhaps with a courageous effort on your part, I might yet retrieve matters.
Pahlawan Khan now regrouped the disorganized army of Azad Khan and clashed with the Shah's troops, and this time, defeated it. Pahlawan Khan also captured Burhan Khan Fufalzai, and returned to Kashmir with Azad Khan. The Shah's troops attempted to reconsolidate after this defeat, and launched an attack, but the Shah's troops were defeated again. Timur Shah, hearing about the events at Kashmir and defeats of his armies in two different battles left to consolidate his armies at Peshawar. From Peshawar, he dispatched Mahadad Khan Ishaqzai with 50,000 men to root out Azad Khan's force, the troops of Timur Shah crossed into Kashmir from two sections, with one force, believed to be around 20,000 men marching through the Baramulla route, the other section including 30,000 men with Madad Khan himself leading, marched over Karnah and camped at Ghagal. Azad Khan, unable to mobilize a defensive force so quickly, had to allow Mahadad Khan to seize Srinagar without any opposition. Mahadad Khan was also able to seize Sher Garhi Fort from Azad Khan's deputy governor, slaying him in the battle as well. Azad Khan's forces were also eventually met, but defeated in multiple engagements. And in the battle of Khoshipura, he received a heavy loss. Contributing factors to his defeat were that Mahadad Khan was able to bring many of Azad Khan's followers to desert from his cause, such as Ahmad Khan. Mostly from convincing them the consequences of what would occur if they were defeated, such as being charged with treachery, which in turn would result to execution. This struck fear into the camp of Azad Khan, including the likely punishment being crushed under an elephant, as it was a growing punishment, effectively securing many to flee to his side. 

Azad Khan assigned Shadi Khan to plan and execute a night attack, Madad Khan found out about this plan, and put his troops in high alert for this night raid. Shadi Khan's force came, and a fierce battle persisted, with Azad Khan himself joining in the battle. Seeing no gains being made however, Azad Khan fled the battlefield and took refuge with his father in law, Rajah Rustam Khan. However, Rustam Khan had received a letter from Mahadad Khan, stating that he would wrap them up in one Kilim if he continued to harbor Azad Khan. Rustam Khan, fearing for his life and that Azad Khan might attempt to usurp his territory he governed, through careful planning, collected all the guns of Azad Khan's army  and as well as his own, however leaving Azad Khan's pistol that he had kept in his waistband. 

Following this, one day, while Azad Khan was napping, Rustam Khan locked the door from the outside and sent letter to Mahadad Khan informing him of what he had done and invited him to arrest Azad Khan. Mahadad Khan then dispatched 2,000 horsemen under Islam Khan to arrest Azad Khan. When Azad Khan woke up, Islam Khan had come in just before he died, and shot himself to commit suicide, Azad Khan opened his eyes and cursed out Islam Khan. After his suicide, Islam cut his head off and delivered it to Timur Shah. Despite the troubles Azad Khan caused him, Timur Shah admired him for his courage. Timur Shah ordered Azad Khan buried, however this did not happen and Azad Khan's corpse was fed to dogs. Timur Shah also invited his mother to collect 2 laks of rupees from her sons property, and granted her royal favors, including a monthly allowance for his mother. Azad Khan ruled Kashmir for two and a half years, ruling from 1783-86 and dying at the age of twenty-one.

Protecting Shah Alam II (1788)

By 1788, Timur Shah Durrani, attempted unsuccessfully to ford the plains of Punjab to rescue his brother-in-law, the Mughal emperor Shah Alam II. The emperor had been blinded by the Rohilla leader Ghulam Qadir, who occupied and plundered Delhi for two and a half months in 1788. Timur Shah prepared an invasion and wrote letters to the English authorities, including Earl Cornwallis, and pleaded for a quick restoration of Shah Alam II to the throne, but was informed that he already had been restored as emperor by the Marathas. Timur Shah ascertained this information by sending an ambassador to the Mughal court and later requested that the British protect and obey the Mughal dynasty.

March Against Shah Murad, Ruler of Bukhara (1788-1789)
During the events of the rebellion in Bahawulpur alongside Timur Shah's attempts to rescue his brother-in-law in Punjab, Shah Murad, the ruler of Bukhara took advantage of Timur Shah campaigning in Punjab to raid Khorasan and Afghan Turkestan, causing great unrest in the region. Shah Murad begun by occupying and plundering the city of Merv, forcing 30,000 of its inhabitants to move to Bukhara. To replace the heavily depopulated city, Shah Murad sent local leaders from Bukhara to renovate and rebuild the city for them. After that, Shah Murad demanded that Timur Shah's governor of Aqcha and Balkh be recalled. When Timur Shah failed to comply, Shah Murad crossed the Amu Darya in the summer of 1788.

At first Timur Shah had ignored reports from the area, but when he heard of the Bukharan march across the Amu Darya after his return from the campaign in Multan, at first, sent a admonitory letter to Shah Murad and his court, in hope that Shah Murad would not launch a campaign against Timur Shah's Realm once again. Shah Murad did not pay attention to this letter, and did not show a reply either, Timur Shah, now visibly angered showed his intentions to invade Bukhara, and mobilized the realm for war. Timur Shah headed north with a massive army, some accounts claim up to over 150,000 men for the  Afghans. Nonetheless, Timur Shah, with his army marched north, at a slow pace to make sure Shah Murad would not be notified of this attack. Timur Shah with his armies arrived at Aqcha on the month of Dhu al-Hijjah, Shah Murad was however prepared, and drew up his men for battle. 

Shah Murad led over 50,000 horsemen to actively harass Timur Shah's army in multiple skirmishes and confrontations, however no decisive battle was inflicted. Seeing this, Shah Murad then gave his brother command of 30,000 horsemen to cross the Amu Darya and launch a night raid on the Afghan camp. However, Timur Shah, having heard of the plan prepared his armies for such occasion, Timur Shah's braves were prepared and when evening of the next day came, Timur Shah intercepted the route of the Bukharan force and engaged in a fierce battle.

Though few depictions of this battle are given, 6,000 Uzbeks casualties were estimated, and a similar number of Afghan dead. Nonetheless, with the Bukharans routed, Shah Murad, fearing what Timur Shah might do next, summoned one of Bukhara's greatest scholars and begged to Timur Shah for forgiveness, also sending a letter promising to not stray from his duties and to remain obedient. Timur Shah accepted this and signed a treaty with Shah Murad, Shah Murad showered Timur Shah with gifts as tribute for his great forgiveness. Timur Shah then reciprocated by giving Shah Murad a robe of honor, and the two borders between the nations were also demarcated. Timur Shah then returned to Kabul, however while crossing through the Hindu Kush, many of his soldiers died due to the cold, and especially from the size of his believed colossal army. This number is likely however realistic, as the Afghans, especially later on in Shah Shuja Durrani's reign recorded mobilization numbers to their armies of up to these accounts.

Uprising of Arsalan Khan
Arsalan Khan, better known as Asadullah Khan, was appointed as governor of Sirhind during the rule of Ahmad Shah Durrani. However he had chosen treason against Timur Shah, and with his own fort at Dakkah, located in the Khyber Pass. Arsalan mobilized Afridi and Mohmand Pashtuns. And with these men, he led multiple campaigns of intercepting royal convoys of the Shah's, including merchant caravans, Arsalan demanded a toll to allow any to pass on themselves, and if paid, they would be escorted through the pass with one of Arsalan's guides. And those who did not pay would not be allowed through, Timur Shah's men attempted on various accounts to capture Arsalan and his followers, but faced trouble doing so in the high mountains, and effectively were not able to wipe out Arsalan and his followers. Timur Shah, angered, chastised his officials for not being able to capture one little thief. Qazi Fayzullah Khan, in an attempt to calm Timur Shah kneeled before him and promised to bring in Arsalan Khan once and for all. By promising Arsalan Khan safety, Fayzullah Khan tricked Arsalan and persuaded him into meeting him, then ambushed him and put him in legcuffs. Fayzullah then returned to Kabul and presented him to Timur Shah. Shah spared him at first due to Fayzullah's promise of personal safety, however after the ramping complaints of what Arsalan did during his time at Dakkah, an order was given for his execution. Following this, his body was tied to an elephants leg and dragged around the city as punishment.

Death and legacy (1793)

Timur Shah's health faced decline due to his constant holing in Peshawar for the winter, and he developed Hypochondriasis, falsely believing that he could be terminally ill. His doctors could not find a cure for this, and blamed it on the climate of Peshawar as a whole. Showing symptoms of Fever, Timur Shah set out to Kabul with winter coming to a close, as he usually in routine lived in Kabul during the summer, and Peshawar during the winter. Prince Zaman, hearing of the Shah's illness set out to meet him at Char Bagh. The Shah, happy kissed Zaman's forehead and attempted to continue his journey to Kabul, leaving Jalalabad. One night, while stopping, he described in a dream he saw to Zaman and Qazi Fayzullah that he saw his crown being lifted to his son, Zaman Shah Durrani. On 18 or 20 May, 1793, Timur Shah passed away from his illness.

"Two images have come to rest, the one yearned.
For the other, inspiring dread.
The sun has risen from the horizon, the moon has sunk to rest.
Like the cycle of sun and moon, Timur the throne descends,
And now the regent Zaman Shah ascends."

After the death of Timur Shah, Zaman Shah Durrani ascended the throne, inheriting the Durrani Empire.

Timur Shah's legacy was of controversial opinion, through many efforts, Timur Shah helped reconsolidate the empire after civil war, defeating a powerful coalition consisting of his brother, Humayun Mirza and Shah Wali Khan. Timur recapture of Multan from Bhangi Misl was a remarkable achievement made by him, Timur Shah's poor efforts to reunite the Pashtun tribes after the death of Ahmad Shah Durrani caused many splits that would tear the empire down for his successors. Timur Shah became more reliant on the Qizilbash and Mongol guards, isolating the Pashtun aristocracy and Nobles, including more of his lineage, the Sadozai. Timur Shah's multiple sons would fight in constant civil war in different phases to secure power for themselves, and peace in Afghanistan would not be seen until nearly 70 years later, with the Durrani dynasty being toppled by the Barakzai dynasty under the reign of Dost Mohammad Khan, who would go on to reunite Afghanistan after it was torn apart by civil war into multiple split nations, including the Emirate of Herat, and Principality of Qandahar. Dost Mohammad would conquer Qandahar in 1855, and Herat in the Herat Campaign of 1862-63.

Five of his sons would eventually become rulers in their own right or contendents for power. According to Fayz Muhammad those sons were as follows (notable sons are in bold):
 Humayun Mirza (would rebel after Timur Shah's death in Kandahar and would attempt to take the throne on 3 separate occasions)
 Mahmud Shah (ruled Afghanistan 1801-1803 and 1809-1818, ruled from 1818 to 1829 in Herat)
 Ahmed Mirza
 Zaman Shah (ruled Afghanistan 1793-1801)
 Sultan Mirza
 Nurdah Mirza
 Malik Gawhar
 Akbar Mirza
 Husein Mirza
 Hasan Mirza
 Abbas Mirza
 Buland Mirza
 Shahrukh Mirza
 Shahpur Mirza
 Jahan Wala
 Firuz al-Din Mirza (ruled Herat virtually independent from 1801 to 1818)
 Ibrahim Mirza
 Faruk Mirza
 Shuja ul-Mulk (ruled Afghanistan 1803-1809), controlled Peshawar briefly in 1810, fled into Sikh and later British protection, made an unsuccessful attempt to conquer Kandahar in 1834, was installed as ruler of Afghanistan by the British from 7 August 1839 until his assassination on 5 April 1842)
 Khawar Mirza
 Ayub Mirza
 Miran Mirza
 Kohandil Mirza
 Nader Mirza

References

Citations

Sources

External links

An old portrait of Timur Shah Durrani
Britannica – Timur Shah (ruler of Afghanistan)
The British Library – Chronology: from the emergence of the Afghan Kingdom to the Mission of Mountstuart Elphistone, 1747–1809

1746 births
1793 deaths
18th-century Afghan monarchs
Durrani dynasty
Emirs of Afghanistan
Pashtun people
People from Mashhad